Lawrence Langner (May 30, 1890 – 1962) was a playwright, author, and producer who also pursued a career as a patent attorney.

Life

Born near Swansea, South Wales and working most of his life in the United States, he started his theatrical career as one of the founders of the Washington Square Players troupe in 1914. He was also involved in patent law and founded the National Inventors Council.

In 1919 he founded the Theatre Guild, where he supervised over 200 productions. He was also founder and Chairman of the American Shakespeare Festival, and with his wife, Armina Marshall, he created and operated the Westport Country Playhouse.

Besides theatre, Lawrence Langner wrote several books, including an autobiography, titled Magic Curtain. He was awarded the 1958 Tony Award for best play production (together with his wife and partners, Theresa Helburn and Dore Schary) for Sunrise at Campobello.

Best known works 
 The Pursuit of Happiness
 Sunrise at Campobello
 Magic Curtain (autobiography)
 The Importance of Wearing Clothes

References
Ladas & Parry (Intellectual Property Firm) - A Brief History
 * Scott Langston, "Exodus in Early Twentieth Century America: Charles Reynolds Brown and Lawrence Langner," in Michael Lieb, Emma Mason and Jonathan Roberts (eds), The Oxford Handbook of the Reception History of the Bible (Oxford, OUP, 2011), 433–446.

External links

 
 Lawrence Langner papers, 1915-1962, held by the Billy Rose Theatre Division, New York Public Library for the Performing Arts
 Lawrence Langner Papers. Yale Collection of American Literature, Beinecke Rare Book and Manuscript Library.

1890 births
1962 deaths
20th-century American dramatists and playwrights
20th-century American lawyers
American theatre directors
People from Westport, Connecticut
People from Swansea
Welsh emigrants to the United States
American male dramatists and playwrights
20th-century American male writers